Nguyễn Văn Sơn may refer to:

 Nguyễn Văn Sơn (footballer) (born 2001), Vietnamese footballer
 Nguyễn Văn Sơn, Vietnamese fashion model, winner of Mister Global 2015